Amirabad-e Amirqoli (also Romanized as Amīrābād-e Amīrqolī) is a village in Balvard Rural District, in the Central District of Sirjan County, Kerman Province, Iran. At the 2006 census, its population was 15, in 4 families.

References 

Populated places in Sirjan County